Wild Men's Dance (aka Danse Sauvage) is a piano work by Russian-American composer Leo Ornstein, dating from either 1913 or 1914. It is widely regarded as the first classical composition to be composed almost entirely of brash tone clusters, predating the "forearm" music of Henry Cowell by a few years. In 1918, critic Charles L. Buchanan described Ornstein's innovation: "[He] gives us masses of shrill, hard dissonances, chords consisting of anywhere from eight to a dozen notes made up of half tones heaped one upon another."

Composition

Ornstein had begun composing works containing dissonant and startling sounds in the early 1910s. Ornstein himself was unsettled by the earliest of these compositions: "I really doubted my sanity at first. I simply said, what is that? It was so completely removed from any experience I ever had." On March 27, 1914, in London, he gave his first public performance of works under the banner of "futurism", now known as modernism. Wild Men's Dance was the foremost piece of these concerts.

Music scholar Gordon Rumson would describe Wild Men's Dance as, "a work of vehement, unruly rhythm, compounded of dense chord clusters [...] and brutal accents. Complex rhythms and gigantic crashing chords traverse the whole range of the piano. This remains a work for a great virtuoso able to imbue it with a burning, ferocious energy."

References

Citations

Sources

External links

Scores
 Leo Ornstein Scores several scores, including Wild Men's Dance, featuring tone clusters

Listening
 

20th-century classical music
1913 compositions
1914 compositions
Compositions for solo piano
Compositions that use extended techniques
Modernist compositions
Music controversies

Music riots